Stefan Ninčić (Serbian Cyrillic: Стефан Нинчић; born 5 November 1991, in Smederevo) is a Serbian football defender who plays for FK Smederevo in the Serbian SuperLiga.

He made his professional debut on 5 May 2012, in Serbian SuperLiga match versus Spartak Subotica.

References

1991 births
Living people
Sportspeople from Smederevo
Serbian footballers
FK Smederevo players
Serbian SuperLiga players
Association football defenders